Erdmannsdorf may refer to:

 Erdmannsdorf (Augustusburg), a village near the town of Augustusburg in Saxony, Germany
 Erdmannsdorf-Zillerthal, a village in Poland now known as Mysłakowice